Johnny McBride (born 9 May 1977) is a Gaelic footballer who played for the Derry county team in the 1990s and 2000s. He won an Ulster Senior Football Championship and two National Leagues with the county, as well as Ulster Minor, Ulster Under 21 and All-Ireland Under-21 Football Championships.

McBride continues to play club football for Naomh Pádraig An Lúb. As captain, he was instrumental in helping An Lúb win the 2003 Ulster Senior Club Football Championship and Derry Championships.

He is a versatile player who can play anywhere in the forward line or in the midfield line for An Lúb.

Playing career

Inter-county
McBride played three years of Minor football for Derry (1993–1995). He reached the Ulster Minor Championship final against Tyrone in 1993, and despite McBride putting in a man of the match display, Derry were defeated. They however won the 1995 Ulster Minor Championship, with McBride as captain and finished runners-up to Westmeath in that year's All-Ireland Minor final. In 1997 he captained Derry when they won the Ulster Under-21 and All-Ireland Under-21 Football Championships, defeating Fermanagh and Meath in the respective finals.

He made his Derry Senior debut in late 1995 (in the 1996 National League) against Kerry. Derry went on to win that year's competition. In 1998, Derry won the Ulster Senior Championship, but lost to Galway in that year's All-Ireland Championship semi-final. In 2000 he won another National League with Derry, defeating Meath in the final. Derry also reached that year's Ulster final, but lost out to Armagh. Derry reached two more All-Ireland semi-finals in 2001 and 2004, but were defeated by Galway and Kerry respectively.

McBride was named Derry captain for the 2006 season, he first An Lúb player to hold the honour. He announced his retirement from inter-county football at the end of the 2006 campaign.

Club
McBride had a successful underage club career including winning two Derry Minor Championships and two Ulster Minor Club Football Championships in 1993 and 1995, and was captain of the 1995 side. In 2003, he captained the club to their first Derry Senior Football Championship in 67 years, and they also went on to win the Ulster Senior Club Football Championship.

School/college
McBride won an All-Ireland Colleges title with his school. He captained the University of Ulster Coleraine team in the Sigerson Cup while a student.

Honours

County

Senior
National Football League:
Winner (2): 1996, 2000
Runner-up: 1998
Ulster Senior Football Championship:
Winner (1): 1998
Runner up: 1997, 2000

Under-21
All-Ireland Under-21 Football Championship:
Winner (1): 1997
Ulster Under-21 Football Championship:
Winner (1): 1997
Runner up: 1996, 1998

Minor
All-Ireland Minor Football Championship:
Runner up: 1995
Ulster Minor Football Championship:
Winner (1): 1995
Runner up: 1993

Club
Ulster Senior Club Football Championship:
Winner (1): 2003
Derry Senior Football Championship:
Winner (2): 2003, 2009
Runner up: 2002, 2005, 2006
Derry Senior Football League:
Winner (1): 2002
Ulster Minor Club Football Championship:
Winner (2): 1993, 1995
Derry Minor Football Championship:
Winner (2): 1993, 1995
Derry Minor Football League:
Winner (2): 1992, 1995
Other underage awards including Under 14 Derry League, Under 16 Derry League & Championship and Ulster Óg Sport

School
Hogan Cup:
Winner (1): 1995
McLarnon Cup:
Winner (1): 1994 (Captain)

Individual
Derry Senior football captain: 2006

Note: The above lists may be incomplete. Please add any other honours you know of.

References

External links
An Lúb GAC website
Official Derry GAA Website
Interview with Hogan Stand magazine (March 1996)
The Sunday Times article on McBride

1977 births
Living people
Derry inter-county Gaelic footballers
An Lúb Gaelic footballers